Pterostillichus caecus is a species of beetle in the family Carabidae, the only species in the genus Pterostillichus.

References

Pterostichinae